León is a province of northwestern Spain in the northern part of the Region of León and in the northwestern part of the autonomous community of Castile and León.

About one quarter of its population of 463,746 (2018) lives in the capital, León. The climate is dry, cold in winter and hot in summer. This creates the perfect environment for wine and all types of cold meats and sausages like the leonese “Morcilla” and the “Cecina”.

There are two famous Roman Catholic cathedrals in the province, the main one in León and another in Astorga. The province shares the Picos de Europa National Park (in the Picos de Europa mountain range) with Cantabria and Asturias. It has 211 municipalities.

History
The province of León was established in 1833 with the new Spanish administrative organisation of regions and provinces to replace former kingdoms. The Leonese Region was composed of the provinces of León, Salamanca and Zamora.

Until 1833, the independently administered Kingdom of León, situated in the northwest region of the Iberian Peninsula, retained the status of a kingdom, although dynastic union had brought it into the Crown of Castile. The Kingdom of León was founded in 910 A.D. when the Christian princes of Asturias along the northern coast of the peninsula shifted their main seat from Oviedo to the city of León. The Atlantic provinces became the Kingdom of Portugal in 1139.

The eastern, inland part of the kingdom was joined dynastically to the Kingdom of Castile first in 1037–1065, again 1077–1109 and 1126–1157, 1230–1296 and from 1301 onward. (See Castile and León#Historic union of the Kingdoms of Castile and León.) León retained the status of a kingdom until 1833, being composed by Adelantamientos Mayores, where Leonese Adelantamiento consisted of the territories between the Picos de Europa and the Duero River.

According to UNESCO, in 1188 the Kingdom of León developed the first Parliament in Europe. In 1202 its parliament approved economic legislation to regulate trade and guilds.

Population
The historical population is given in the following chart:

Languages

The Provincial Government of León signed accords with language associations for promoting the Leonese language. Leonese is taught in the city of León, Mansilla de las Mulas, La Bañeza, Valencia de Don Juan or Ponferrada for adult people, and in sixteen schools of León. The City Council of León writes some of its announcements in Leonese in order to promote the language.

In the western part of the El Bierzo, the westernmost region of the province, Galician language is spoken and taught at schools.

Climate

As for the temperatures, in general it is a cold climate due to the altitude and the abundance of frost (which persist from November to May), being more intense in the mountainous areas reaching -18 °C. Vega de Liordes, an enclave in the León sector of Picos de Europa belonging to the municipality of Posada de Valdeón registered  on January 7, 2021.

Cuisine
Embutidos
 Cecina de León: from beef. In the Leonese language, cecina means "meat that has been salted and dried by means of air, sun or smoke". Cecina de León is made of the hind legs of beef, salted, smoked and air-dried in the province of León, and has PGI status.
 Botillo: from pig. Traditionally made in the western Leonese regions, botiellu in Leonese or botelo in Galician, is a dish of meat-stuffed pork intestine. It is a culinary specialty of the county of El Bierzo and also of the region of Trás-os-Montes in Portugal. This type of embutido is a meat product made from different pieces left over from the butchering of a pig, including the ribs, tail, and bones with a little meat left on them. These are chopped; seasoned with salt, pepper, garlic, and other spices; stuffed in the cecum of the pig; and partly cured via smoking. It can also include the pig's tongue, shoulder blade, jaw, and backbone, but never exceeding 20% of the total volume. It is normally consumed cooked, covered with a sheet. It also has a PGI status.

Cheese
 Queso de Valdeón (Valdeón cheese): a blue cheese produced in Posada de Valdeon, traditionally wrapped in chestnut or sycamore maple leaves before being sent to market.

Wines
 Bierzo: in the west of the Province of León and covers about 3,000 km2. The area consists of numerous small valleys in the mountainous part (Alto Bierzo) and of a wide, flat plain (Bajo Bierzo). The denominación de origen covers 23 municipalities.
 Tierra de León: in the southeast of the Province of León.

Sweets
 Mantecadas de Astorga
 Hojaldres de Astorga
 Lazos de San Guillermo
 Nicanores de Boñar

Municipalities
 List of municipalities in León

Comarcas
 El Bierzo 
 Maragatería
 Tierra de Campos
 La Montaña
 La Ribera
 La Cabrera
 Tierras de La Bañeza
 Tierras de León

See also
 Santiago de Peñalba
 Castrillo de los Polvazares
 Cave of Valporquero
 Kingdom of León
 Leonese language
 List of municipalities of León
 Montes de León

Notes and references

External links

 The Official Tourism Website of the Province of Leon
 Leonese Provincial Government
 Leonese City Council